Bangladesh Railway Class 2600 is one of the most frequently used meter-gauge diesel electric locomotive classes of Bangladesh Railway. It is considered one of the strongest and most reliable locomotive classes among the fleet of Bangladesh Railway. These locomotives have been in service since 1988. Currently, Bangladesh Railway has a total of 16 locomotives of this class. These 16 locomotives are being used in both passenger services and freight services. All of them are in good condition.

Builders details 

The Class 2600 locomotives are built by General Motors Diesel at its London, Ontario plant, Canada. These 16 locomotives came to Bangladesh in 3 phases.

Technical details 
Class 2600 is a 1500 hp locomotive using the EMD 645 diesel engine. The Electro Motive Division export model of this locomotive is GT18L-2. The wheel arrangement of this locomotive is A1A-A1A. This locomotive can speed up to 107 km/h with passenger trains. Class 2600 locomotives have a similar specification to Bangladesh Railway Class 2900 locomotives.

The Bangladesh Railway specification of this locomotive is 'M.E.G -15'. Here - M stands for meter-gauge, E Stands for diesel electric, G stands for General Motors and 15 stands for locomotive horsepower (x100).

Usage 

The Class 2600 locomotive can be used both for passenger services and freight services. In the early days, the Class 2600 locomotive was highly recommended for prominent Bangladeshi trains like Subarna Express, Mohanagar Express, Parabat Express etc. Currently, Class 2600 locomotives are mostly used for freight trains.

The Class 2600 locomotive is considered as efficient for freight services as any other meter-gauge locomotive of Bangladesh Railway. It pulls containers, oil tankers and other departmental freight trains regularly across the country.

Maintenance 
Class 2600 locomotives are maintained in the following workshops:

Central Locomotive Workshop (CLW) at Parbatipur, Dinajpur.
Diesel Workshop at Pahartali, Chittagong.

See also
 Transport in Bangladesh
 Parabat Express
 Kalni Express
 Lalmoni Express
 Bangladesh Railway Class 2000
 Bangladesh Railway Class 2900

References

Locomotives of Bangladesh
Railway locomotives introduced in 1988
A1A-A1A locomotives
General Motors Diesel locomotives
Metre gauge diesel locomotives